The 186th Ohio Infantry Regiment, sometimes 186th Ohio Volunteer Infantry (or 186th OVI) was an infantry regiment in the Union Army during the American Civil War.

Service
The 186th Ohio Infantry was organized at Camp Chase in Columbus, Ohio, in February 1865 and mustered in for one year service under the command of Colonel Thomas Francis Wilder.

The regiment was attached to 2nd Brigade, 2nd Separate Division, Department of the Cumberland, to May 1865. 2nd Brigade, 1st Separate Division, District of the Etowah, Department of the Cumberland, to July 1865. 2nd Brigade, 4th Division, District of East Tennessee, Department of the Cumberland, to September 1865.

The 186th Ohio Infantry mustered out of service September 18, 1865, at Nashville, Tennessee, and was discharged September 25, 1865, at Columbus, Ohio.

Detailed service
Left Ohio for Nashville, Tennessee, March 2. Moved to Murfreesboro, Tennessee, March 8, 1865; then to Cleveland, Tennessee, and duty there until May. Moved to Dalton, Georgia, May 2; then to Chattanooga, Tennessee, May 10, and duty there until July 20. Moved to Nashville, Tennessee, July 20, and duty there until September 19. Ordered to Columbus, Ohio, September 19, and mustered out September 25, 1865.

Casualties
The regiment lost a total of 50 enlisted men during service; 1 killed and 49 due to disease.

Commanders
 Colonel Thomas Francis Wilder

See also

 List of Ohio Civil War units
 Ohio in the Civil War

References
 Dyer, Frederick H. A Compendium of the War of the Rebellion (Des Moines, IA:  Dyer Pub. Co.), 1908.
 Ohio Roster Commission. Official Roster of the Soldiers of the State of Ohio in the War on the Rebellion, 1861–1865, Compiled Under the Direction of the Roster Commission (Akron, OH: Werner Co.), 1886–1895.
 Reid, Whitelaw. Ohio in the War: Her Statesmen, Her Generals, and Soldiers (Cincinnati, OH: Moore, Wilstach, & Baldwin), 1868. 
Attribution

External links
 Ohio in the Civil War: 186th Ohio Volunteer Infantry by Larry Stevens
 National flag of the 186th Ohio Infantry
 Regimental flag of the 186th Ohio Infantry
 Guidon of the 186th Ohio Infantry

Military units and formations established in 1865
Military units and formations disestablished in 1865
Units and formations of the Union Army from Ohio
1865 establishments in Ohio